Besides may refer to:

 Besides (EP), a 1999 EP by Do Make Say Think
 Besides (Over the Rhine album), 1997
 Besides (Sugar album), 1995
 Besides (Cold Chisel album), 2011
 Besides (Bleu album), 2011